AUS or Aus may refer to:

Country code
 Australia, ISO 3166-1 alpha-3 country code
 Austria, UNDP country code

Medicine
 Artificial urinary sphincter, a medical implant
 AUS (thyroid nodule diagnostic class)

Military
 Army of the United States, the wartime conscription component of the United States Army

People and tribes
 Aus (surname)
 Banu Aus, one of the Arabian tribes who interacted with the Muhammed

Places
 Aus, Namibia, a village in Karas Region, Namibia

Transportation
 Augusta and Summerville Railroad, a railroad in Georgia, United States
 Austin station, an MTR rapid transit station in Hong Kong, China on the Tuen Ma line
 Austin–Bergstrom International Airport, Austin, Texas, United States; IATA airport code
 Robert Mueller Municipal Airport, Austin, Texas, United States formerly used IATA code AUS prior to its reassignment to Austin–Bergstrom International Airport

Universities
 American University of Sharjah, United Arab Emirates
 Assam University, Silchar, India
 AUS, post-nominal letters for an Associate of the University of Surrey, United Kingdom

Athletics governance
 Atlantic University Sport, the governing body for university sport in Canada's Atlantic provinces

Student and staff unions
 Association of University Staff of New Zealand, merged in 2009 to form the New Zealand Tertiary Education Union
 Australian Union of Students, a former organization succeeded by the National Union of Students in 1987

Other 
 Ankh wedja seneb (Ā.U.S.), an ancient Egyptian phrase meaning "Life, Prosperity, Health"
 Aqueous urea solution, a component of diesel exhaust fluid
 Aus rice, a type of rice grown in summer months
 Australian Aboriginal languages (ISO 639-2 and ISO 639-5 codes)